The Asahi class of destroyers of the Japan Maritime Self-Defense Force is optimized for undersea warfare. The class was initially designated "25DD", referring to a date on the Japanese calendar, specifically the 25th fiscal year of the Heisei period (2013).

The lead ship, Asahi, is the third ship to hold the name after the Asahi-class destroyer escort lent from the United States Navy in 1955, and the Imperial Japanese battleship. The second ship of the class, Shiranui, is the third ship to hold the name after the Murakumo and Kagerō-class destroyers.

Development 
The procurement of the destroyer began in 2013 in response to the reduction in the number of destroyers (namely the ) within the JMSDF. The two major characteristics of this destroyer is its bigger emphasis on anti-submarine warfare and the adoption of the COGLAG (combined gas turbine electric and gas turbine:  a modification of the combined gas and gas propulsion system employing electric propulsion system for low-speed cruising) propulsion system. A second destroyer was procured a year later.

Design
The Asahi class is based on the existing  to reduce acquisition cost and allow future development and growth. Unlike the Akizuki class (which focuses on anti-aircraft warfare) the Asahi class focuses on anti-submarine warfare.

Features
The Asahi class is the first Japanese warship to be equipped with a COGLAG propulsion system. This allows the destroyer to be more fuel efficient than previous warships. Another unique feature about this destroyer is the usage of a GaN-AESA (gallium nitride - active electronically scanned array) Multifunction Radar. The Asahi class is the second Japanese class of warship to be outfitted with this technology (the Akizuki class was the first). The destroyer's radar is based on the FCS-3A radar used for the Akizuki class and uses gallium nitride to improve performance. In radar technology, gallium nitride offers a number of advantages over the traditionally used gallium arsenide (GaA). These advantages include higher power density, efficiency, thermal spreading and frequency coverage. This in turn allows the GaN chip to be smaller than their GaA counterpart, thus reducing cost and increasing overall cost effectiveness.

Ships in the class

References